Onchan, historically Kirk Conchan, is one of the seventeen historic parishes of the Isle of Man.

It is located on the east of the island (part of the traditional South Side division) in the sheading of Middle, though before 1796 it was in the sheading of Garff.

Administratively, part of the historic parish of Onchan is now covered by part of the borough of Douglas, the capital and largest town of the Isle of Man.

Local government
For the purposes of local government, most of the historic parish forms a single district with Commissioners.

In 1896, an area in the south-west of the historic parish of Onchan became part of the borough of Douglas, since when it has been governed by a municipal corporation with 18 councillors and an elected mayor.

The district of Onchan was formed in 1986 by the re-amalgamation of two local authority areas, Onchan village and the larger rural area of Onchan parish. These two local authority areas had been separated from one another in 1895.

The Captain of the Parish (since 2011) is Peter Kelly, MBE.

Politics
Onchan parish is split between two House of Keys constituencies: Onchan, covering the built-up area of Onchan village, and the Garff constituency, which includes the larger rural area of Onchan parish. Each constituency elects two Members to the House of Keys. From 1986 until 2016 the whole of Onchan was its own constituency, and before 1986 it was in the Middle constituency.

The part of the historic parish which falls under the Borough of Douglas elects MHKs to one or more of the Douglas constituencies.

Geography
The village of Onchan (formerly known as Kirk Conchan, as it was dedicated to St Conchan) is situated on a headland to the north of Douglas, of which it is a suburb, and has good views over Douglas Bay. The parish stretches from Windy Corner on the TT course in the north to Port Groudle and the town of Douglas in the south; it is bounded to the west by the River Glass and the East Baldwin Valley, to the east by the parish of Lonan and to the south by the Irish Sea. The main settlement in the parish is the village of Onchan which has the second largest population on the island.

The parish is largely agricultural and has only one centre of population, Onchan village. Apart from the hilly region in the north west, it is a fertile and well-cultivated district. Along the hillside near Douglas there are country villas. The parish also has several large reservoirs that store water for Douglas and the surrounding villages.

The parish has three National Glens: Molly Quirk's Glen, Groudle Glen and Bibaloe Walk, which end at Groudle Beach, where there is holiday accommodation. The Groudle Glen Railway runs for a short distance along the coast from Lhen Coan to the Headland and then on to the terminus at Sea Lion Rocks, where passengers can alight and see the remains of the Victorian zoo which until World War II housed sea lions and polar bears.

Like the other parishes on the island, Onchan was historically subdivided into "treens": areas of land bounded by natural features such as rivers. According to the 1511 Manorial Roll, Onchan contained the following treens:

Slekby
Alia-Begod
Begod  (now Bygoad)
Byballo (now Bibaloe)
Hawstrake (now Howstrake)
Horaldre
Tremsare
Tremott
Douglas

Onchan wetlands
The Onchan wetlands is a  reserve in Onchan village which contains a variety of habitats. The site was donated to the Manx Wildlife Trust in 1988. It is open to the public for viewing and has a boardwalk which is suitable for wheelchair users.

The site contains curragh (wetlands - willow scrub), broadleaved trees, dub (pond), neutral grassland and embankments of tall grassland. This variety of habitats leads to a diversity of wildlife and plant life. Some of the plants/trees that grow there are silver birch, ash, holly, rowan, marsh marigold, yellow flag, reed canary grass, hemlock water-dropwort, woody nightshade and cuckoo flower. Among the wide variety of birds on the site are the grey wagtail, goldcrest, woodcock, chiffchaff and hen harrier. There are also invertebrates, bats, and many frogs and spawn in early summer.

MHKs and elections

Elections results since 2016 
In 2014, Tynwald approved recommendations from the Boundary Review Commission which saw the  reform of the Island's electoral boundaries.

Under the new system, the Island was divided into 12 constituencies based on population, with each  area represented by two members of the House of Keys.

As a result Onchan's electoral boundaries were changed significantly, with much of the north-easterly part of the village and the parish's rural areas becoming part the enlarged Garff constituency.

2016

2021

References

External links
Manxnotebook - Onchan
Isle of Man Building Control Districts
Glenology - Manx Glens study website
Curragh Kiondroghad, Manx Wildlife Trust
Constituency maps and general election results

Parishes of the Isle of Man
Constituencies of the Isle of Man